Polybutadiene acrylonitrile (PBAN) copolymer, also noted as polybutadiene—acrylic acid—acrylonitrile terpolymer is a copolymer compound used most frequently as a rocket propellant fuel mixed with ammonium perchlorate oxidizer. It was the binder formulation widely used on the 1960s–1970s big boosters (e.g., Titan III and Space Shuttle SRBs).

Polybutadiene acrylonitrile is also sometimes used by amateurs due to simplicity, very low cost, and lower toxicity than the more common hydroxyl-terminated polybutadiene (HTPB). HTPB uses isocyanates for curing, which have a relatively quick curing time; however, they are also generally toxic. PBAN based propellants also have a slightly higher performance than HTPB based propellants.
PBAN is normally cured with the addition of an epoxy resin, taking several days at elevated temperatures to cure.

Usages
PBAN was to be used in the Constellation program, later canceled, as this copolymer was to be used in the first stage of the Ares I rocket in five segments.  However future versions of Ares I were discussed using liquid propellants as a potential alternative. PBAN is currently used in the solid rocket boosters on the SLS rocket.

References

Rocket fuels
Acrylate polymers
Copolymers
Plastics